Barbados national basketball team represents Barbados in international competitions. It is administrated by the Barbados Amateur Basketball Association (BABA).

At the Caribbean Basketball Championship, Barbados has been one of the strongest teams, winning two gold medals and two silver medals.

Competitive record

FIBA AmeriCup

Caribbean Championship

1981 : 4th
1982-1993 : ?
1994 : 
1995-1996 : ?
1998 : 
2000 : 
2002 : 5th 
2004 : 
2006 : 5th  
2007 : 6th
2009 : 6th
2011 : -
2014 : 6th
2015 : 7th

Commonwealth Games

2006: 5th

Current roster
As of 2018 

|}

| valign="top" |

Head coach
 Nigel Lloyd

Assistant coaches
 Derek Browne

Legend

Club – describes lastclub before the tournament
Age – describes ageon 24 June 2018

|}

Depth chart

Past rosters

Head coach position
 Nigel Lloyd - 2004-2006
 Adrian Craigwell - 2009
 Nigel Lloyd - 2014-2015, 2018

See also
Barbados national under-19 basketball team
Barbados national under-17 basketball team
Barbados women's national basketball team
Barbados national 3x3 team

References

External links
Presentation at CaribbeanBasketball.com
Archived records of Barbados team participations
LatinBasket - Barbados Men National Team
Presentation on Facebook

Videos
LIVE - Guyana v Barbados - FIBA AmeriCup 2021 - CBC Prequalifiers Youtube.com video

Basketball in Barbados
Men's national basketball teams
Basketball
1962 establishments in Barbados